Tristán Ulloa (born 6 May 1970) is a Spanish actor, writer, and director.

Career
He was born in Orléans and lived with his Spanish grandparents exiled in France. He spent his teenage years in Vigo, Galicia. His mother, Esther San Román, lives in Hortaleza, Madrid as of 2005. Ulloa graduated from the Lycée Français de Madrid.

He has appeared in numerous films, notably Lucía y el sexo (Sex and Lucía), a 2001 Spanish drama film, written and directed by Julio Médem, with Paz Vega.

On 18 March 2019, it was announced that Ulloa was cast as Father Vincent in the upcoming Netflix fantasy series, Warrior Nun.

Personal life
He tested positive for COVID-19 in March 2020 and subsequently made a full recovery.

Filmography

References

External links
 
 

1970 births
Living people
Male actors from Galicia (Spain)
Spanish male television actors
Spanish male film actors
Spanish film directors
20th-century Spanish male actors
21st-century Spanish male actors